Celeriac (Apium graveolens var. rapaceum), also called celery root, knob celery, and turnip-rooted celery (although it is not a close relative of the turnip), is a variety of celery cultivated for its edible stem or hypocotyl, and shoots. Celeriac is like a root vegetable except it has a bulbous hypocotyl with many small roots attached.

In the Mediterranean Basin and in Northern Europe, celeriac is widely cultivated. It is also cultivated in North Africa, Siberia, Southwest Asia, and North America. In North America, the 'Diamant' cultivar predominates.

History 

Celeriac and celery originated in the Mediterranean Basin. It was mentioned in the Iliad 
and Odyssey 
as selinon. Celeriac was grown as a medicinal crop in some early civilizations. Celery contains a plant compound called apigenin, which was used in traditional Chinese medicine as an anti-inflammatory agent.

Culinary use

However, a growing trend (specifically in South American cuisine, particularly Peruvian) is to use the immature vegetable, valued for its intensity of flavour and tenderness overall. It is edible raw or cooked, and tastes similar to the leaf stalks of common celery cultivars. Celeriac may be roasted, stewed, or blanched, and may be mashed. Sliced celeriac is used as an ingredient in soups, casseroles, and other savory dishes. The leaves (both the stalks and the blades) of the vegetable are quite flavoursome, and aesthetically delicate and vibrant, which has led to their use as a garnish in contemporary fine dining.

However, the vegetable will tend to rot through the centre if the finer stems surrounding the base are left attached. If celeriac is not fresh its centre becomes hollow, though even when freshly harvested there can be a small medial hollow. The freshness will also be obvious from the taste; the older it is, the weaker the celery flavour.

See also
 List of vegetables
 List of root vegetables

Explanatory notes

References

External links
 Nutritional Summary for Celeriac , cooked, boiled, drained, without salt
  

Edible Apiaceae
Root vegetables
Celery

de:Echter Sellerie#Knollensellerie
it:Sedano rapa